= Naptha, Virginia =

Unincorporated community in Virginia, United States

Coordinates: 36°49′45″N 77°50′27″W

Naptha is an unincorporated community located in Brunswick County, in the U.S. state of Virginia.

It has also been called Crossroads.

The Abernathy family were one of the five families who founded Brunswick County.

in the early 1920s, Robert Abernathy built a country store at the intersection of Poor House and Liberty roads across from the Crossroads School.

The store closed in the late 1980s. The old school (now a storage barn) was destroyed by fire in the 1990s.
